Khalakhaljid Sands was a battle between Genghis Khan, then known as Temüjin, and the forces of Toghrul, khan of the Kereit. The Kereit elites, deeply suspicious of Temüjin's diplomatic overtures to Toghrul, had convinced their leader to turn on his vassal. Warned by two herdsmen, Temüjin had escaped a planned ambush, but was pursued by a larger force. His Mongol allies came to his aid at the Khalakhaljid Sands, but they were comprehensively defeated. Following the battle, which saw Temüjin's seventeen year old son Ögedei become severely wounded, the young khan swore the Baljuna Covenant with his companions.

References

Battles involving the Mongol Empire
Genghis Khan
Conflicts in 1203
1200s in the Mongol Empire